Elections to the Council of the Isles of Scilly took place on 6 May 2021, alongside other United Kingdom local elections. All 16 seats on the council were up for election. There are 12 councillors for St Mary’s and 1 each of the other inhabited isles of Bryher, St Agnes, St Martin’s and Tresco.

Ward results

No persons were nominated for Bryher. Consequently the Returning Officer is required to order an election to fill the vacancy on a day appointed by them before Friday 25 June. A notice of election will be issued in due course but not until after the May elections have passed.

See also 

 Council of the Isles of Scilly elections

References

Council of the Isles of Scilly elections
2020s in Cornwall
2021 English local elections